Loudon Park Cemetery is a historic cemetery in Baltimore, Maryland. The entrance to the cemetery is located at 3620 Wilkens Avenue.

The cemetery and Loudon Park Funeral Home, Inc. are locally owned and operated. Both the cemetery and the funeral home became privately owned in 2014 when they were acquired from Service Corporation International (SCI). Loudon Park Funeral Home was built on the grounds of the historic cemetery by Stewart Enterprises in 1995. SCI acquired Stewart Enterprises in 2013.

Loudon National Cemetery
A portion of the eastern section is owned by the federal government as Loudon Park National Cemetery, acquired in 1861, and holds the remains of 2,300 Union soldiers killed during the Civil War. There is also a Confederate section where about 650 Confederate soldiers are buried, marked by a statue of a Confederate soldier. Since 2003, nearly all of the Confederates in this section have had new markers put on their graves under an "Adopt-a-Confederate" program. The entrance to the National Cemetery portion of Loudon Park is located along Frederick Avenue in the neighborhood of Irvington.

Notable persons
Notable persons interred here include:
 Charles J. Baker (1821–1894), ex officio Mayor of Baltimore
 Thomas Beck (1909–1995), actor
 Charles Joseph Bonaparte (1851–1921), former United States Attorney General, former United States Secretary of the Navy, founder of the Federal Bureau of Investigation.
 Jerome Napoleon Bonaparte (1805–1870), son of Jérôme Bonaparte, nephew of Emperor Napoleon I, father of Charles Joseph Bonaparte.
 William Samuel Booze (1862–1933, U.S. Congressman from Maryland's 3rd District, 1897–1899
 Abel G. Cadwallader (1841–1907), Civil War Medal of Honor recipient.
 Jack L. Chalker (1944–2005), author
 Clarence Lemuel "Cupid" Childs (1867–1912), Major League Baseball Player.
 Barnes Compton (1830–1898), former Congressman and Maryland state Treasurer.
 Frederick Nicholls Crouch (1808–1896), composer.
 Elijah Cummings (1951–2019), U.S Congressman from Maryland's 7th district, 1996–2019.
 Frederick George D'Utassy (1827–1892), Civil War Union Army officer
 David Danforth (1890–1970), Major League Baseball player
 James William Denny (1838–1923), Civil War Confederate Army officer and U.S. Congressman for Maryland's 3rd District, 1899–1901 and 1903–1905
 Lewis Pessano "Buttercup" Dickerson (1858–1920), Major League Baseball player
 Charles W. Field (1828–1892), military officer in the United States, Confederate and Egyptian armies
 John T. Ford (1829–1894), operator of Ford's Theater
 James Albert Gary (1833–1920), former United States Postmaster General.
 Harry Gilmor (1838–1883), Confederate cavalry officer and Baltimore City Police Commissioner.
 William Henry Gorman (1843–1915), cofounder of Citizens Bank of Maryland
 Bradley T. Johnson (1829–1903), Writer, Confederate Brigadier General, commanded the 1st Maryland Regiment (C.S.A.).
 William Kimmel (1812–1886), U.S. Congressman for Maryland's 3rd District, 1877–1881.
 Frederic Arnold Kummer (1873–1943), American author, playwright and screenwriter
 William W. McIntire (1850–1912), U.S. Congressman for Maryland's 3rd District, 1897–1899.
 H. L. Mencken (1880–1956), journalist, critic, author, and essayist.
 Ottmar Mergenthaler (1854–1899), inventor of the Linotype.
 Howard S. O'Neill (1883–1966), state senator and lawyer
 Mary Young Pickersgill (1776–1857), seamstress who made the flag flying over Fort McHenry during the Battle of Baltimore, inspiring Francis Scott Key to write "The Star-Spangled Banner".
 Robert John Reynolds (1838–1909), former governor of Delaware.
 Samuel J. Seymour (1860–1956), the last surviving witness to the assassination of Abraham Lincoln.
 Frank S. Strobridge (1857–1918), American politician and insurance businessman
 Alpheus Waters Wilson (1834–1916), bishop of the American Methodist Episcopal Church, South

The Weiskittel-Roehle Burial Vault, faced with cast iron, was listed on the National Register of Historic Places in 1976.

Images

References

External links
 
 
 "Loudon Park" Political Graveyard
 Loudon Park – Explore Baltimore Heritage

Cemeteries in Baltimore
Confederate States of America cemeteries
Irvington, Baltimore
Maryland in the American Civil War
Burial sites of the House of Bonaparte
1853 establishments in Maryland